Achudamangalam  is a village in the Nannilam taluk of Tiruvarur district in Tamil Nadu, India.

Demographics 

As per the 2001 census, Achudamangalam had a population of 2,120 with 1,085 males and 1,035 females. The sex ratio was 954. The literacy rate was 69.36.

References 

 

Villages in Tiruvarur district